Matthew P. Denn (born February 9, 1966) is an American lawyer and politician from New Castle County, Delaware. He served as the 45th attorney general of Delaware from 2015 until 2019. Denn previously served as the 25th lieutenant governor of Delaware from 2009 to 2015, and was the Insurance Commissioner of Delaware from 2005 to 2009. After leaving public office, Denn joined the global law firm DLA Piper as Managing Partner of the firm's Wilmington office.

Early life and education
Denn was born in Wilmington, Delaware, to Morton Denn, a professor of chemical engineering at the City College of New York, and Marilyn Denn. He grew up in suburban Hockessin and attended H.B. du Pont Middle School. He later moved to California with his family during high school. He graduated with a Bachelor of Arts from the University of California, Berkeley, and he received his Juris Doctor from Yale Law School in 1991.

Professional career
Returning to Delaware in 1991, Denn worked for two years with Delaware Volunteer Legal Services, providing pro bono legal services to the underserved and underrepresented. Entering private practice, Denn became a partner with the law firm of Young, Conaway, Stargatt & Taylor in 2000. He was awarded the Distinguished Service Award from the Young Lawyers Section of the Delaware State Bar Association. 

In 1998, Denn was appointed by Governor Tom Carper to serve as chairman of the Child Protection Accountability Commission, formed following the death of a four year old whose abuse and neglect went undetected by a state investigation. Under Denn's leadership, the commission lobbied to for caseload standards and career ladders for child protection workers, working to prevent inexperience and high turnover from compromising child safety.

Political career
Denn served as Governor Ruth Ann Minner's legal counsel from 2001 through 2003, writing legislation including the Patient's Bill of Rights and the Emergency Health Powers Act.

In 1998, Denn ran for a seat in the Delaware State Senate against incumbent Republican Bob Connor. He lost that race but was elected State Insurance Commissioner in 2004, defeating Karen Weldin Stewart in the Democratic primary race, and later defeating Republican Party candidate, Dave Ennis, a member of Delaware General Assembly, in the general election. Denn served as Insurance Commissioner from January 4, 2005, until January 4, 2009.

Denn was elected Lieutenant Governor of Delaware in 2008, winning 61 percent of the vote to defeat Republican opponent State Senator Charlie Copeland. Another Democratic candidate, Wilmington City Council President Ted Blunt, ended his campaign in spring 2008, allowing Denn to avoid a primary contest. He took office in a ceremony just after midnight on January 20, 2009. As Lieutenant Governor, Denn focused on issues affecting children.

In 2014, Denn was the Democratic nominee for Attorney General, and he defeated Republican nominee Ted Kittila in the November general election. He served until 2019 and did not seek reelection.

Personal life
Denn lives in Newark, Delaware with his wife, Michele, and their two twin boys. He is Jewish.

Electoral history

References

External links

|-

1966 births
21st-century American politicians
Delaware Attorneys General
Delaware Democrats
Delaware lawyers
Jewish American people in Delaware politics
Lieutenant Governors of Delaware
Living people
People from Hockessin, Delaware
People from Wilmington, Delaware
University of California, Berkeley alumni
Widener University faculty
Yale Law School alumni
21st-century American Jews